This is a list of destinations served currently by Shanghai Airlines as of February 2019.

Destinations

See also
 Shanghai Airlines Cargo.

References

External links
Shanghai Airlines Route Chart
Shanghai Airlines Flight Timetable

Lists of airline destinations